Radical 201 or radical yellow meaning "yellow" is one of the 4 Kangxi radicals (214 radicals in total) composed of 12 strokes.

In the Kangxi Dictionary, there are 42 characters (out of 49,030) to be found under this radical.

The xin zixing form of this radical, is the 192nd indexing component in the Table of Indexing Chinese Character Components predominantly adopted by Simplified Chinese dictionaries published in mainland China.

 is also the Japanese simplified form (shinjitai) of this radical character.

Evolution

Derived characters

Variant forms
This radical has different forms in different languages or characters.

While Hong Kong and Taiwan have selected different forms as their standards, the two traditional forms are often interchangeable.

In Japanese, the simplified (shinjitai) form  is used in jōyō kanji (e.g. ), while the traditional form  is used in hyōgai kanji (e.g. ).

See also
 Wong (surname)

Literature

External links

Unihan Database - U+9EC3

201
192